Dogecoin (  or , Abbreviation:  DOGE; sign: Ð) is a cryptocurrency created by software engineers Billy Markus and Jackson Palmer, who decided to create a payment system as a "joke", making fun of the wild speculation in cryptocurrencies at the time. It is considered both the first "meme coin", and, more specifically, the first "dog coin". Despite its satirical nature, some consider it a legitimate investment prospect. Dogecoin features the face of the Shiba Inu dog from the "doge" meme as its logo and namesake. It was introduced on December 6, 2013, and quickly developed its own online community, reaching a market capitalization of over $85 billion on May 5, 2021. As of 2021, it is the sleeve sponsor of Watford Football Club. 

Dogecoin.com promotes the currency as the "fun and friendly Internet currency", referencing its origins as a "joke". Software engineers Billy Markus and Jackson Palmer launched the satirical cryptocurrency as a way to make fun of Bitcoin and the many other cryptocurrencies boasting grand plans to take over the world. With the help of Reddit, the site became an instant hit. Within two weeks, Dogecoin had established a dedicated blog and forum, and its market value has reached US$8 million, once jumping to become the seventh largest electronic currency in the world. Dogecoin is based on Scrypt algorithm, and the transaction process is more convenient than Bitcoin. Dogecoin takes only 1 minute to confirm, while BTC takes 10 minutes.

History

Originally formed as a "joke", Dogecoin was created by IBM software engineer Billy Markus and Adobe software engineer Jackson Palmer. They wanted to create a peer-to-peer digital currency that could reach a broader demographic than Bitcoin. In addition, they wanted to distance it from the controversial history of other coins. Dogecoin was officially launched on December 6, 2013, and within the first 30 days, there were over a million visitors to Dogecoin.com.

Palmer is credited with making the idea a reality. At the time, he was a member of the Adobe Systems marketing department in Sydney. Palmer had purchased the domain Dogecoin.com and added a splash screen, which featured the coin's logo and scattered Comic Sans text. Markus reached out to Palmer after seeing the site, and started efforts to develop the currency. Markus had designed Dogecoin's protocol based on existing cryptocurrencies Luckycoin and Litecoin, which use scrypt technology in their proof-of-work algorithm.  The use of scrypt means that miners cannot use SHA-256 bitcoin mining equipment, and instead must use dedicated FPGA and ASIC devices for mining which are known to be more complex to produce.

On December 19, 2013, Dogecoin jumped nearly 300% in value in 72 hours, rising from US$0.00026 to US$0.00095, with a volume of billions of Dogecoins per day. This growth occurred during a time when bitcoin and many other cryptocurrencies were reeling from China's decision to forbid Chinese banks from investing into the bitcoin economy. Three days later, Dogecoin experienced its first major crash by dropping by 80% due to this event and to large mining pools exploiting the small amount of computing power required at the time to mine Dogecoin.

On December 25, 2013, the first major theft of Dogecoin occurred when millions of coins were stolen during a hack on the online cryptocurrency wallet platform Dogewallet. The hacker gained access to the platform's filesystem and modified its send/receive page to send any and all coins to a static address. This hacking incident spiked tweets about Dogecoin, making it the most mentioned altcoin on Twitter at the time, although it was in reference to a negative event. To help those who lost funds on Dogewallet after its breach, the Dogecoin community started an initiative named "SaveDogemas" to help donate coins to those who had them stolen. Approximately one month later, enough money was donated to cover all of the coins that were stolen.

In January 2014, the trading volume of Dogecoin briefly surpassed that of Bitcoin and all other cryptocurrencies combined. However, its market capitalization remained substantially behind that of Bitcoin. Initially, Dogecoin featured a randomized reward that is received for each mining block. However, in March 2014, this behaviour was later updated to a static block reward.

Co-founder Jackson Palmer left the cryptocurrency community in 2015 and has no plans to return, having come to the belief that cryptocurrency, originally conceived as a libertarian alternative to money, is fundamentally exploitative and built to enrich its top proponents. His co-founder, Billy Markus, agreed that Palmer's position was generally valid.

During 2017 to early 2018 cryptocurrency bubble, Dogecoin briefly reached a peak of US$0.017/Ð1 on January 7, 2018, putting its total market capitalization near US$2 billion.

In July 2020, the price of Dogecoin spiked following a TikTok trend aimed at getting Dogecoin to US$1.

On May 9, 2021, SpaceX announced a rideshare mission to the Moon completely funded by Dogecoin, thus becoming the first space mission funded by a cryptocurrency. Elon Musk confirmed this news via Twitter. DOGE-1 was planned to be a minor 40 kg rideshare payload on Intuitive Machines' IM-1 mission in Q1 2022.

On August 14, 2021, the Dogecoin Foundation announced the "re-establishment of the Dogecoin Foundation (est 2014), with a renewed focus on supporting the Dogecoin Ecosystem, Community and promoting the future of the Dogecoin Blockchain." The Foundation was reinvigorated by the addition to its Board of notable advisors such as Vitalik Buterin (Ethereum co-founder and inventor) and Jared Birchall (representing Elon Musk).

2021 boom and subsequent fall 
In January 2021, Dogecoin went up over 800% in 24 hours, attaining a price of US$0.07, as a result of attention from Reddit users, partially encouraged by Elon Musk and the GameStop short squeeze. In February 2021, Dogecoin hit a new high price of US$0.08 following Twitter encouragement from Musk, Snoop Dogg and Gene Simmons. In March 2021, Dallas Mavericks owner Mark Cuban announced his NBA team would allow purchasing tickets and products with Dogecoin; within two days, Cuban had declared his franchise had become the top Dogecoin merchant, having carried out 20,000 transactions.

In April 2021, Dogecoin and other cryptocurrencies surged, stimulated in part by the direct listing for cryptocurrency exchange Coinbase on April 14, although that platform did not provide trading of Dogecoin. Its price first reached US$0.10 on April 14, before hitting a new high of US$0.45 on April 16 (up 400% that week), with a volume of nearly US$70 billion traded in the preceding 24 hours. , Dogecoin's market capitalization approached US$50 billion, making it the fifth-highest-valued cryptocurrency; its value had increased more than 7,000% year-to-date. Interest in Dogecoin contributed to an outage in electronic trading platform Robinhood's cryptocurrency system on April 15, caused by "unprecedented demand", and prompted concerns from experts of a nearing speculative bubble in the cryptocurrency market.

On May 4, 2021, the value of Dogecoin first surpassed the symbolic hurdle of US$0.50, a greater than 20,000% increase in one year.

On May 8, 2021, despite—or perhaps because of—expectations of a surge in interest in Dogecoin resulting from Elon Musk's appearance on Saturday Night Live, Dogecoin dropped 34% from US$0.711 at the opening of the show to below US$0.470 45 minutes later. By the following morning Dogecoin hit a swing low of US$0.401, a cumulative drop of 43.6% and lost value of US$35 billion.

As of July 2022, DOGE has fallen below US$0.07, and its US$8.9 billion market cap makes it the tenth-largest cryptocoin.

Use and exchanges
Dogecoin is an altcoin with a large userbase, and is traded against both fiat currencies and other cryptocurrencies on several reputable cryptocurrency exchanges and retail investment platforms.

Trading physical, tangible items in exchange for DOGE takes place on online communities such as Reddit and Twitter, where users in such circles frequently share cryptocurrency-related information.

Several cases of people using their employers' or universities' computers to mine Dogecoin have been discovered.

Dogecoin has also been used in an attempted property sale, it and has been used in the pornography and gambling industries.

Online tipping 
One major mainstream commercial application of the cryptocurrency has been Internet-based tipping systems, in which social media users tip other users for providing interesting or noteworthy content.

Dogetipbot 
Dogetipbot was a cryptocurrency transaction service used on popular sites like Reddit and Twitch. It allowed users to send Dogecoins to other users through commands via Reddit comments. In May 2017, Dogetipbot was discontinued and taken offline after its creator declared bankruptcy; this left many Dogetipbot users losing their coins stored in the Dogetipbot system.

Technology and DeFi
DeFi (decentralized finance) is a form of finance that does not rely on middlemen such as brokerages, exchanges, or banks to offer financial instruments. This is accomplished using "smart contracts" which are automated enforceable agreements that do not need intermediaries like a bank or lawyer, but use online blockchain technology instead. While Dogecoin cannot interact with smart contracts directly given that it operates on its own chain, the coins can be "wrapped" so that they can be locked into a state that is interoperable with a contract until it is later released. The Ren Project has enabled Dogecoin (renDOGE) to be used on the Ethereum blockchain and access the DeFi network. Most DeFi coins use the Ethereum blockchain network. DeFi linked coins use decentralized applications ("dApps") to transact and trade on decentralized exchanges (DExs). An example of a Dexs is Uniswap; these are entirely peer-to-peer exchanges, without any company or other institution providing the platform.

Currency supply 

Dogecoin started with a supply limit of Ð100 billion, which would have been far more coins than the top digital currencies were then allowing. By mid-2015, the 100 billionth Dogecoin had been mined, with an additional Ð5 billion put into circulation every year thereafter. Although there is no theoretical supply limit, at this rate, the number of Dogecoins put into circulation will only double in 20 years (the next doubling will occur in the year 2075). There is no implemented hard cap on the total supply of Dogecoins. Nonetheless, in February 2014, Dogecoin founder Jackson Palmer announced that the limit would be removed in an effort to create a consistent reduction of its inflation rate over time. In other words, the inflation rate improves over time starting at 5% in 2015 to less than 4% by 2019, 3% by 2027, and 2% by 2035.

Mining parameters
Dogecoin's implementation differs from its predecessors: It was originally forked from Litecoin, then refactored to Bitcoin. Dogecoin's target block time is 1 minute, as opposed to Litecoin's 2.5 minutes and Bitcoin's 10 minutes.

Fundraising

2014 Winter Olympics

The Dogecoin community and foundation have encouraged fundraising for charities and other notable causes. On January 19, 2014, a fundraiser was established by the Dogecoin community to raise US$50,000 for the Jamaican Bobsled Team, which had qualified for, but could not afford to go to, the Sochi Winter Olympics. By the second day, US$36,000 worth of Dogecoin was donated and the Dogecoin to bitcoin exchange rate rose by 50%.  The Dogecoin community also raised funds for a second Sochi athlete, Shiva Keshavan.

Doge4Water

Inspired by the Winter Olympics fundraiser and smaller charity fundraising successes, the Dogecoin Foundation, led by Eric Nakagawa, began collecting donations to build a well in the Tana river basin in Kenya in cooperation with Charity: Water. They set out to raise a total of Ð40,000,000 (US$30,000 at the time) Dogecoin before World Water Day (March 22). The campaign succeeded, collecting donations from more than 4,000 donors, including one anonymous benefactor who donated Ð14,000,000 (approx. US$11,000 at the time, or US$2.8m in 2021).

NASCAR

On March 25, 2014, the Dogecoin community successfully raised Ð67.8 million (around US$55,000 at the time) in an effort to sponsor NASCAR Sprint Cup Series driver Josh Wise. Nicknamed the "Moonrocket", the No. 98 car featured a Dogecoin/Reddit-sponsored paint scheme and was driven by Wise at the Aaron's 499 at Talladega Superspeedway. Wise and the car were featured for nearly a minute, during which the race commentators discussed Dogecoin and the crowdfunding effort, while finishing twentieth and narrowly avoiding multiple wrecks.
On May 16, Wise won a spot at the Sprint All-Star Race through an online fan vote beating Danica Patrick, largely due to the efforts of the Dogecoin Reddit community. He finished the race in fifteenth, the last car running. The following race in the Coca-Cola 600, Wise debuted a Dogecoin/Reddit.com helmet. Wise later announced he would run the car again at the Toyota/Save Mart 350 and the GEICO 500 as a thank-you gift to the community. He finished twenty-eighth in the race due in part to a refueling issue; he was in twelfth place after a gas-and-go pit stop, but the gas can did not engage long enough, resulting in a second pit stop that took him towards the back of the pack. Eutechnyx, the developer of the NASCAR '14 video game, added the Dogecoin car as a drivable car in a DLC pack.

On March 2, 2021, NASCAR Xfinity Series team B. J. McLeod Motorsports announced that Dogecoin would be sponsoring the № 99 car in the Alsco Uniforms 300 at Las Vegas alongside Springrates; Stefan Parsons drove the car to a 36th-place finish as fuel line issues prevented him from completing the race. Coincidentally, his father Phil was the owner of the team that fielded the original Dogecoin-sponsored car in 2014.

Criticism
Dogecoin's origin as a "joke", which makes it the first meme coin, has made it difficult to be taken seriously by mainstream media and financial experts. The cryptocurrency has had a long and problematic history of scams. Similar to many other cryptocurrencies, Dogecoin has been described by some commentators as a form of Ponzi scheme. Critics allege that Dogecoin investors who purchased Dogecoins early on, have a large financial incentive to draw others into purchasing more Dogecoins in order to drive the price up, therefore benefitting the early investors financially at the direct expense of later purchasers. This is primarily because Dogecoin does not have a supply cap like other cryptocurrencies such as Bitcoin, which has a capped supply of 21 million coins. Dogecoin has instead a deliberately stable, "deterministic inflation" rate of Ð10,000 per block, with a block time of one minute. Exactly Ð5 billion in new Dogecoins will be created and enter circulation every year.

Positives 
While the price of Dogecoin is volatile, this volatility has its benefits. It allows investors to use strategies such as cryptocurrency day trading or scalping to profit from fast, short-lived price swings. Additionally, while the cryptocurrency may have begun as a "joke", it was the 10th-largest cryptocurrency in the world in September 2021, with a market capitalisation of US$26 billion. Larger coins included Bitcoin, Ethereum, Cardano, Binance Coin, Tether, and XRP. Mark Cuban has stated of Dogecoin that, "Doge has 'deterministic inflation' meaning the amount of inflation is defined. There is no uncertainty as to the amount of created and it's  inflation percentage. Which could allow it to grow as a valid payment mechanism. The unknown is whether enough people will use it this way."

Elon Musk and Dogecoin 

Elon Musk frequently uses his Twitter platform to express his views on Dogecoin, which has led some to claim that his actions amount to market manipulation because the price of Dogecoin frequently experiences price movements shortly after Dogecoin-related tweets released by Elon Musk. Nevertheless, because cryptocurrencies are not regulated like stocks, these actions are not illegal. Musk and his promotion of Dogecoin have been criticized by Dogecoin co-founder Jackson Palmer, who called Musk a "self-absorbed grifter".

Musk's first Dogecoin-related tweet occurred on December 20, 2020. Musk tweeted "One Word: Doge". Shortly after, the value of Dogecoin rose by 20%.

This was followed by a series of Dogecoin-related tweets by Musk in early February 2021 captioned "Dogecoin is the people's crypto" and "no highs, no lows, only Doge". Following these tweets, the value of Dogecoin rose by roughly 40%.

On April 15, 2021, the price of Dogecoin rose by more than 100% after Musk tweeted an image of Joan Miró's Dog Barking at the Moon painting captioned "Doge Barking at the Moon".

On May 8, 2021, Dogecoin fell as much as 29.5%, dropping to US$0.49 during Elon Musk’s Saturday Night Live appearance.

The price of Dogecoin rose by 11% on May 20, 2021, shortly after Musk tweeted a Doge-related meme.

In May 2021, the price of Dogecoin was up 10% in the hours after Musk tweeted a Reddit link for users to submit proposals to improve the cryptocurrency.

On December 14, 2021, Dogecoin spiked more than 20% after Elon Musk said that Tesla will accept the currency as a means of payment for Tesla merchandise.

On June 16, 2022, Elon Musk was named in a complaint seeking damages of $258 billion. The complaint was filed in federal court in Manhattan by plaintiff Keith Johnson. Johnson cited Musk's repeated use of his massive social influence to promote the altcoin, which he claims artificially inflated the price.

On October 27, 2022, Elon Musk completed a deal to take Twitter private for $44 billion. This led to a sustained rise in Dogecoin from the 25th to the 29th, with the highest increase of 45.51%. It was reported back in 2013 that Musk thinks dogecoin can be used for Twitter transactions.

See also  
 Shiba Inu (cryptocurrency)

References

Notes

External links
 

Currencies introduced in 2013
Cryptocurrency projects
Computer-related introductions in 2013
Satire
Internet memes